The Welch-Averiett House, in Talladega County, Alabama near Sylacauga, Alabama, dates from 1830. It was listed on the National Register of Historic Places in 1986.

The house was built around 1920.  It is a "a rambling twelve room clapboard bungalow little changed since c.1920. It has a hipped roof with broad eaves and a shed dormer decorated with angular brackets. The exterior is clapboard irregularly fenestrated with 6/6 wooden sash windows. There are four exterior brick chimneys. Two board and batten 'cabins' adjoin the rear with gabled and shed additions to the west end."

It is also known as the L.L. Dean House and was known in the 1800s as Welch Spring.

Other parts of the estate are older.  The listing includes a rammed earth smokehouse.

The original settler, Daniel Welch was living on this property by 1831.

This was listed along with three other properties as part of a study of the estate.

See also
Benjamin H. Averiett House
William Averiett House
Goodwin-Hamilton House

References

National Register of Historic Places in Talladega County, Alabama
Houses completed in 1920